Fon is a hamlet in the municipality of Tønsberg in Vestfold og Telemark county, Norway. It is the site of Fon Church. In the recent past there were several farms here. Fon hosts a small music festival called Revårock, held since 2002.

School

The Fon Primary School operated in Fon from 1987 until the summer of 2009. It served children from first to fourth grade, and it was part of the Fon Early Development Center and Primary School, along with the Vivestad and Fon preschools. Since 2009, the area's children have attended the Kirkevoll Primary School in Våle.

References

Tønsberg
Villages in Vestfold og Telemark